Silberstraße may refer to:

Silver Road (German:Silberstraße), a tourist route in Saxony, Germany 
Silberstraße (Wilkau-Haßlau), a village in Saxony, Germany